Harry Thumann (28 February 1952 – 2001) was a German electronic composer, record producer and sound engineer. He designed and built groundbreaking synthesizers and studio equipment from the early 1960s onwards.

Born Harald Thumann in Germany, he started out as a drummer while getting a thorough grounding in audio engineering in German broadcasting. When touring lost appeal, Thumann put his musical and technical experience to work and started his first recording studio in a bedroom at the family home. Thumann participated in the development of the SSL 4000 series of consoles, and took the first one for this studio. Premises for a permanent studio with live-in accommodation were found in Germering near Munich, and Country Lane Studios were born.

Thumann later recognised the potential of MIDI, and used Commodore 64 computers with MIDI cards, controlling a system that evolved into a synthesizer installation including Fairlight II and Moog 3C modular system. This led to a string of albums for Rondò Veneziano, which married both acoustic instruments and synthesizers. Thumann released his first solo album American Express in 1979. It had the hit single "Underwater", which was later used in the video game Grand Theft Auto IV. His second solo album was Andromeda, released in 1982, contained the highly influential track The Sphinx, which later inspired the theme to Knight Rider. Both albums remain out of print and only released on vinyl. American Express was given a remastered digital release on iTunes, but Andromeda remains left out.

Thumann had a run of what he called "dog records", under the 'Wonder Dog' name, which received some success in Germany and the UK  (through E&S Music). The single, "Ruff Mix", peaked at #31 in the UK Singles Chart in September 1982.

With the introduction of the Yamaha DMP-7 digital mixer, Thumann built a second control room housing several DMP-7s as an integrated digital console system, interfaced with a rebuilt Neve broadcast console. Country Lane moved into audio-visual production, and started producing its own telefilms.

Discography

Albums

 1979 American Express
 "American Express" – 7:26
 "Give A Little Help" – 8:30
 "Underwater" – 6:05
 "You Turn Me On" –   4:45
 "Christine" – 6:30

 1983 Andromeda
 "Andromeda" - 7:48
 "I'm Happy To Be In The Sun" - 5:30
 "Out Of Tune" - 2:31
 "Welcome Back, Jolette" - 4:58
 "Bitch" - 3:30
 "Paris 1944" - 3:57
 "Sphinx" - 5:19
 "Living On A Farm" - 2:56

Singles
 1979 "Underwater" - UK #41; US Hot Dance Club Songs #17
 1982 "Andromeda"
 1982 "Living On A Farm"

Remixes
 1992 "Break Down the Line" (Extended Version) on Jam Tronik's "Stand by Me" (Dance Mix)

References

External links
 

1952 births
2001 deaths
German composers
German record producers
German audio engineers
German keyboardists
20th-century German musicians